

Cynesige (died  963) was a medieval Bishop of Lichfield.

Cynesige was consecrated between 946 and 949 and died between 963 and 964. He was a relative of Dunstan and left the king's court soon after the coronation of King Eadwig of England in January 956, along with Dunstan who was Abbot of Glastonbury at the time. The Life of Dunstan states that the reason the bishop and abbot were dismissed from court was that they denounced the new king and his new bride Ælfgifu.

Notes

Citations

References

Further reading

External links
 

960s deaths
10th-century English bishops
Anglo-Saxon bishops of Lichfield
Year of birth unknown